Vicq-sur-Nahon is a commune in the Indre department in central France.

Population

Toponymy
The inhabitants are called the Vicquois.

See also
Communes of the Indre department

References

Communes of Indre